The Slocan Ramblers are a Canadian bluegrass music group from Toronto, Ontario. They are most noted for their 2018 album Queen City Jubilee, which received a Juno Award nomination for Traditional Roots Album of the Year at the Juno Awards of 2019.

History

The Slocan Ramblers formed in 2011; the band is named for the Slocan Valley in British Columbia. The group consists of mandolinist Adrian Gross, banjo player Frank Evans, guitarist Darryl Poulsen, and bassist Alastair Whitehead. Evans, Whitehead and Poulsen all perform vocals depending on the song.

They released their debut album, Shaking Down the Acorns, in 2012, and followed up with Coffee Creek in 2015. Coffee Creek received a Canadian Folk Music Award nomination for Best Traditional Album at the 12th Canadian Folk Music Awards.

In 2016 the Slocan Ramblers toured in the United States for three months.

In 2018 the Ramblers opened for Jerry Douglas at the Saskatchewan Jazz Festival. In 2019 the band performed at the International Bluegrass Music Association Momentum Awards event in Raleigh, North Carolina. That year they also performed at the Cowichan Valley Bluegrass Festival in British Columbia.

Discography 
Shaking Down the Acorns (2012)
Coffee Creek (2015)
Queen City Jubilee (2018)
Up the Hill and Through the Fog (2022)

References

External links

Canadian bluegrass music groups
Musical groups from Toronto
Musical groups established in 2011
2011 establishments in Ontario
Canadian Folk Music Award winners